Nervo may refer to:

People

Nervo (DJs), Australian DJs Olivia Nervo and Miriam Nervo, known by their stage name NERVO
Amado Nervo, a Mexican poet
Carlo Nervo (born 1971), Italian professional footballer 
Hugo Nervo (born 1991), Argentine football defender
Jacques de Nervo (1897–1990), French industrialist.
Luis Padilla Nervo (1894–1985), Mexican politician and diplomat.
Robert de Nervo (1842–1909), French industrialist

Other

Nervo (crater), a crater on the planet Mercury
Nervo and Knox, Jimmy Nervo and Teddy Knox, part of the original Crazy Gang
Mount Nervo, mountain in Antarctica

See also 
 Nerva  (disambiguation)
 Nervi (disambiguation)